George May Keim (March 23, 1805 – June 10, 1861) was a Democratic member of the U.S. House of Representatives from Pennsylvania.

Biography
George May Keim (uncle of William High Keim), was born in Reading, Pennsylvania.  He attended Princeton College, studied law, was admitted to the bar in 1826 and commenced practice in Reading.  He was a major general of militia.  He was a delegate to the State constitutional convention of 1837 and 1838.

Keim was elected as a Democrat to the Twenty-fifth Congress to fill the vacancy caused by the resignation of Henry A. P. Muhlenberg.  He was reelected to the Twenty-sixth and Twenty-seventh Congresses.  He was the chairman of the United States House Committee on Militia during the Twenty-sixth and Twenty-seventh Congresses.  He was appointed by President John Tyler as United States marshal for the United States District Court for the Eastern District of Pennsylvania on December 18, 1843.  He was reappointed by President James K. Polk on January 3, 1848, and served until 1850.  He was mayor of Reading in 1852, and was a presidential elector on the Democratic ticket of Stephen A. Douglas and Herschel V. Johnson in 1860.  He died in Reading in 1861.  Interment Reading's Charles Evans Cemetery.

Sources

The Political Graveyard

1805 births
1861 deaths
Burials at Charles Evans Cemetery
Mayors of Reading, Pennsylvania
Pennsylvania lawyers
Democratic Party members of the United States House of Representatives from Pennsylvania
Princeton University alumni
United States Marshals
1860 United States presidential electors
19th-century American politicians
19th-century American lawyers